David DiLeo (born February 28, 1997) is an American professional basketball player who plays for Czarni Słupsk of the Polish Basketball League. He played college basketball for the Central Michigan Chippewas.

High school career
As a child, DiLeo enjoyed shooting the basketball from long range, but his parents encouraged him to develop his complete game. DiLeo attended Iowa City West High School. He helped the team win three state championships and became a starter as a junior, averaging 12.5 points per game. As a senior, DiLeo averaged 15.3 points and 4.5 rebounds per game while shooting 44.5 percent from 3-point range, helping the team to a 25–1 record and a third-place finish at the Class 4A state tournament. DiLeo was named 2015 Iowa City Press-Citizen boys' basketball player of the year. He also played on the tennis team and won three state titles and a doubles state title. After graduating from high school, DiLeo played a postgraduate year at New Hampton School in New Hampshire.

College career
DiLeo played college basketball at Central Michigan. He averaged 8.5 points and 5.0 rebounds per game as a freshman. In his third career start as a sophomore, a 103–68 win over Eureka College, DiLeo scored 28 points. As a sophomore, DiLeo averaged 12.4 points and 6.6 rebounds per game, leading the conference in three-pointers with 96. DiLeo posted 24 points and 10 rebounds in a win against Western Michigan. He averaged 12.1 points and 4.9 rebounds per game as a junior, helping the Chippewas to a 23–12 record. As a senior, he averaged 14.5 points and 5.1 rebounds per game, shooting 40% from three-point range. DiLeo was named an All-MAC honorable mention and was selected to the All-District 14 Second Team by the National Association of Basketball Coaches. He set the MAC record with 337 career 3-pointers and finished seventh in Central Michigan history in rebounds (733) and eighth in career points (1,604).

Professional career
On June 29, 2020, DiLeo signed with UCAM Murcia of the Spanish Liga ACB. In 19 games, DiLeo averaged 8.1 points, shooting with 37% from the 3-point line, 54.5% from the field and 90% from the free throw line, playing around 18 minutes per contest. In January 2021, he suffered an injury on his right hand that prematurely ended his season. 

On July 13, 2021, DiLeo signed with PAOK Thessaloniki of the Greek Basket League. In 24 league games, he averaged 9.5 points (shooting with 39% from the 3-point line) and 3.9 rebounds, playing around 21 minutes per contest.

On July 25, 2022, Czarni Słupsk of the Polish Basketball League announced his signing.

Personal life
DiLeo's father Frank played college basketball at Lafayette and served as an assistant coach at Virginia and Iowa before becoming a scout for the Philadelphia 76ers. His mother Kay coached women's basketball at Indiana State. DiLeo is a cousin of T. J. DiLeo and Max DiLeo, his uncle is Tony DiLeo.

References

External links
Central Michigan Chippewas bio
Twitter

1997 births
Living people
American expatriate basketball people in Greece
American expatriate basketball people in Spain
American men's basketball players
Basketball players from Iowa
CB Murcia players
Central Michigan Chippewas men's basketball players
Czarni Słupsk players
Iowa City West High School alumni
Liga ACB players
P.A.O.K. BC players
Power forwards (basketball)
Small forwards
Sportspeople from Iowa City, Iowa